Alin Mihai Manea (born 9 January 1997) is a Romanian professional footballer who plays as a midfielder for Gloria Buzău.

References

External links
 
 

1997 births
Living people
People from Buzău
Romanian footballers
Association football midfielders
Romania youth international footballers
Romania under-21 international footballers
Liga I players
Liga II players
CSM Corona Brașov footballers
CS Universitatea Craiova players
CS Sportul Snagov players
AFC Dacia Unirea Brăila players
AFC Chindia Târgoviște players
SSU Politehnica Timișoara players
FC Gloria Buzău players